AAB, AaB or Aab may refer to:

Aviation and military 

 Air Assault Badge, a United States Army military badge
 Arrabury Airport in Queensland, Australia
 Abelag Aviation in Belgium
 Anti-aircraft battery, a weapons system component for anti-aircraft warfare

Companies and organizations 

 Aalborg Boldspilklub, a sports club in Aalborg in Denmark
 AaB A/S, Aalborg Boldspilklub A/S, a Danish company
 ABN AMRO, the largest bank in the Netherlands
 Aboriginal Arts Board, an historical name for part of the Australian Council for the Arts
 Act Against Bullying, a UK charity
 Adyar Ananda Bhavan, a food business in India 
 Akita Asahi Broadcasting, a television station in Akita Prefecture, Japan
 Arubaanse Atletiek Bond, the governing body for the sport of athletics in Aruba
 Athletics Association of Barbados, the governing body for the sport of athletics in Barbados
 Association of Applied Biologists, a UK-based learned society promoting applied biology

People 
 Aab (surname)
 Alice Bailey, new age writer often referred to by her initials as AAB
 Akbar Al Baker, Qatar Airways CEO often referred to by his initials as AAB

Other uses 
 .aab, the filename extension for Android App Bundles
 aab, the ISO 639-3 code for the Alumu language, a Niger–Congo language of Nigeria
 Acetic acid bacteria, classified under alphaproteobacteria which are used in making vinegar
 Aniline Yellow or aminoazobenzene
 Bar form, a musical form of the pattern AAB